Rajah Buayan, officially the Municipality of Rajah Buayan (Maguindanaon: Ingud nu Rajah Buayan; Iranun: Inged a Rajah Buayan), is a  municipality in the province of Maguindanao del Sur, Philippines. According to the 2020 census, it has a population of 27,832 people.

The municipality was created under Muslim Mindanao Autonomy Act No. 166 dated October 28, 2002, and was ratified through plebiscite on September 4, 2004. It was carved out of the town of Sultan sa Barongis.

Geography

Barangays

Rajah Buayan is politically subdivided into 11 barangays.

Baital
Bakat
Dapantis
Gaunan
Malibpolok
Mileb
Panadtaban
Pidsandawan
Sampao
Tabungao
Zapakan (Poblacion)

Climate

Demographics

Economy

References

External links
 Rajah Buayan Profile at the DTI Cities and Municipalities Competitive Index
 [ Philippine Standard Geographic Code]
Philippine Census Information
Local Governance Performance Management System

Municipalities of Maguindanao del Sur
Populated places on the Rio Grande de Mindanao